The GS platform (also known as "Project Global" by Mitsubishi) is a compact car platform co-developed and shared by Mitsubishi Motors and DaimlerChrysler.

History
After dissolution of the DaimlerChrysler / Mitsubishi partnership in 2004, DaimlerChrysler made substantial changes to the platform subsequently naming it the JS platform for mid-size cars and PM/MK for compact cars. 

Mitsubishi's GS vehicles are manufactured in Japan with the exception of the RVR/Outlander Sport, which was manufactured at the former Diamond-Star Motors plant in Normal, Illinois, USA. Mitsubishi's first GS platform car was the 2005 Mitsubishi Outlander crossover SUV. 

PM/MK vehicles from Chrysler are assembled at Belvidere Assembly in Belvidere, Illinois (Dodge Caliber and Jeep Compass) and JS Vehicles were produced at the Sterling Heights Assembly (Chrysler 200 and Dodge Avenger). 

Chrysler said the 200's predecessor, the Chrysler Sebring, and Avenger did not use the GS platform, though that was their starting point.

Vehicles

Mitsubishi
 2006–2021 Mitsubishi Outlander
 2007–2017 Mitsubishi Lancer
 2007–present Mitsubishi Delica D:5
 2008–2016 Mitsubishi Lancer Evolution
 2010–present Mitsubishi ASX/RVR/Outlander Sport
 2017–present Mitsubishi Grand Lancer
 2017–present Mitsubishi Eclipse Cross

Chrysler/Fiat
 2007–2012 Dodge Caliber (PM)
 2007–2017 Jeep Compass (MK49)
 2007–2017 Jeep Patriot (MK74)
 2007–2010 Chrysler Sebring sedan (JS)
 2008–2010 Chrysler Sebring Convertible (JS)
 2008–2014 Dodge Avenger (JS)
 2009–2020 Dodge Journey/Fiat Freemont (JC49)
 2011–2014 Chrysler 200/Lancia Flavia (JS)

Citroën/Peugeot
 2007–2012 Citroën C-Crosser/Peugeot 4007
 2012–2017 Citroën C4 Aircross/Peugeot 4008

Proton
 2010–2015 Proton Inspira

References

GS